Convoy HX 126 was the 126th of the numbered series of World War II HX convoys of merchant ships from HalifaX to Liverpool.

Prelude 
The ships departed Halifax on 10 May 1941. At this time, there were no escorts to provide protection against U-boats for the whole duration of the journey across the North Atlantic. For the first leg of the crossing, the only escort was the armed merchant cruiser  which task was to provide protection against merchant raiders. 

On the U-boat side, the submarines were reorganized in the group West after the attack on convoy OB 318 and were sent to scout for convoys ever more westward.

Action 
On 19 May, the U-boat  found the convoy and she directed the other boats of the group West. The group began their attacks on 20 May. The first attack of U-94 in the early morning misses, but in a second attack she sank one or two ships. Then contact with the convoy is lost.
The next U-boat,  found the convoy at noon. In two attacks U-556 sank three ships. As the convoy was still unescorted at the time, it started to break up.

 discovered the large 13,000-ton tanker San Felix and damaged it with a torpedo, but the tanker did not belong to HX 126. It was an outbound vessel from the dispersed convoy OB 322. In the evening  sank the freighter Rothermere. Around the same time U-94 regained contact with the convoy and sank the tanker John P. Pedersen. Just before midnight,  sank the straggler Harpagus with two torpedoes. Harpagus had fallen behind to rescue survivors from Norman Monarch. The 12th escort group, which comprised at the time five destroyers, four corvettes and two anti-submarine trawlers, arrived and started to round up the dispersed ships and reform the convoy. Five of the escorts find U-109 and damage the submarine with depth charges. As a result U-109 aborted to France.

In the early morning of 21 May,  struck the tanker Elusa which was later scuttled.  was damaged and forced to abort to France by depth charge attacks from the corvette  and a destroyer (either  or ). Upon learning that a strong escort has arrived, German command disengaged the U-boats and reformed them in a new patrol line further south. Only U-111 is left in place in order to transmit decoy radio signals. On 22 May U-111 found and sank Barnby which either straggled or romped from the convoy.

Ships in the convoy

Allied merchant ships
A total of 33 merchant vessels joined the convoy, either in Halifax or later in the voyage. Surviving ships reached Liverpool on 28 May.

Convoy escorts
A series of armed military ships escorted the convoy at various times during its journey.  Only one escort was present during the German attacks.

References

Bibliography

External links
HX.126 at convoyweb

HX126
Conflicts in 1941
Naval battles of World War II involving Germany
Naval battles of World War II involving Canada
C